Ipiguá is a municipality in the state of São Paulo, Brazil. The population is 5,476 (2020 est.) in an area of 136 km². Ipiguá is located 20 km from São José do Rio Preto. The municipality belongs to the Microregion of São José do Rio Preto.

References

Municipalities in São Paulo (state)